Akash Vijayvargiya is an Indian politician of BJP from Indore, Madhya Pradesh. In 2018 Madhya Pradesh Legislative Assembly election, Vijayvargiya defeated Indian National Congress veteran and 3 time MLA Ashwin Joshi by a margin of over 5700 votes to win his debut election. He is author of book Dev Se Mahadev. This book was launched in presence of Baba Ramdev. He is the eldest son of Bharatiya Janata Party's National General Secretary Kailash Vijayvargiya.
Akash Vijayvargiya was awarded by "Daink Bhaskar Eminent award 2021" at Delhi for his extra ordinary efforts to help society during Covid Era.

Biography

He joined the BJP since 2008 and presently from 11 November 2012 as the District Officer of Deendayal Mandal Serving.

Controversies 
On 26 June 2019, he was in the news for beating up a government servant with a cricket bat, an action which drew sharp criticism from all quarters, including members of his own political party. After the video clip got viral, he was arrested by MP police.

References

External links

Living people
Politicians from Indore
Madhya Pradesh MLAs 2018–2023
Bharatiya Janata Party politicians from Madhya Pradesh
1984 births